UTC+08:30 is an identifier for a time offset from UTC of +08:30.

History
This time zone became the Local Mean Time in Davao Oriental and in easternmost areas of the Philippines from January 1, 1845, until May 10, 1899, by the virtue of Claveria's decree to reform the country calendar by skipping December 31, 1844, that redrew the International Date Line from being west of the country to go east and made the Philippines have same dates with the rest of Asia. The whole archipelago was an entire day behind its neighboring Asian territories for 323 years, 9 months, and 2 weeks since Magellan's arrival in Limasawa on March 16, 1521, that caused by the tricky and unmentioned international date line during the 16th century.

UTC+08:30 was Standard Time of South Korea from 1954 to 1961 and it was the time zone of North Korea from 2015 to 2018. This time was also used for Changpai Time Zone in northeast China between 1918 and 1949.

See also
Time in China
Time in North Korea
Time in South Korea

References

 

UTC offsets
Time in North Korea

es:Huso horario#UTC+08:30, H†